Shankhnaad is a 2019 Rajasthani languages Drama movie produced by CA Anil Yadav under Ru-Aryan Entertainment. The movie was directed by Santosh Kranti Mishra and Stars Kshitij Kumar, Sanjana Sen, Shravan Sagar and Atharv Shrivastava as lead characters.

The film is inspired by the true events of Rajasthan, which is related to the struggle of shepherd blacksmiths. Muhurat short of 'Shankhnaad' was shot in Mansarovar, Jaipur.

During Rajasthan Film Festival 2022 in the Rajasthani cinema category, 'Shankhnaad' won the Best Film, the main hero of the film, Shravan Sagar, the Best Actor and Santosh K. Mishra was given the Best Writer Award.

References

External links 

Rajasthani-language films